The 1935 Montana Grizzlies football team represented the University of Montana in the 1935 college football season as a member of the Pacific Coast Conference (PCC). The Grizzlies were led by first-year head coach Doug Fessenden, played their home games at Dornblaser Field and finished the season with a record of one win, five losses and two ties (1–5–2, 0–5–1 PCC).

Schedule

References

Montana
Montana Grizzlies football seasons
Montana Grizzlies football